Takuma Ito may refer to:

Takuma Ito (basketball) (born 1982), Japanese basketball coach
Takuma Ito (footballer) (born 1986), Japanese footballer